Montmorenci is an unincorporated census-designated place in Shelby Township, Tippecanoe County, Indiana.  Older maps sometimes spell the name Montmorency or Montmorencie.

It is part of the Lafayette, Indiana Metropolitan Statistical Area.

History
An old variant name of the community was called Bringham's Grove.

A post office was established under the name Bringham's Grove in 1846, and was renamed to Montmorenci in 1853. It is currently not in operation.

Geography
Montmorenci is located at 40°28'28" North, 87°01'46" West (40.474444, -87.029444) in Shelby Township, at the intersection of U.S. Routes 52 and 231. It has an elevation of 699 feet.

Demographics

Education

A brick school was built in 1913 at a cost of $40,000. By 1923, this school housed classes from grades 1 to 12, and all other schools in the immediate district closed. Montmorenci School met a similar fate in 1966, closing as part of a consolidation that moved the upper grades into the new Benton Central Jr./Sr. High School.

Even though Montmorenci is in Tippecanoe County, all public education is provided by the Benton Community School Corporation from neighboring Benton County. Students attend Otterbein Elementary in grades K-6, then move on to Benton Central Jr./Sr. High School in grades 7-12.

References

Unincorporated communities in Tippecanoe County, Indiana
Unincorporated communities in Indiana
Census-designated places in Tippecanoe County, Indiana
Census-designated places in Indiana
Lafayette metropolitan area, Indiana